Reiner Plaßhenrich is a German former professional footballer who played as a midfielder. He spent his whole career in Germany, playing for SC Verl, SpVgg Greuther Fürth, SC Paderborn 07, VfB Lübeck and Alemannia Aachen.

References

External links
Profile at Alemannia Aachen 

1976 births
Living people
Association football midfielders
German footballers
SpVgg Greuther Fürth players
SC Paderborn 07 players
VfB Lübeck players
Alemannia Aachen players
Bundesliga players
2. Bundesliga players
Sportspeople from Paderborn
Footballers from North Rhine-Westphalia